The Coppola family is an Italian-American family of filmmakers and performing artists.

The family originates from Bernalda in the region of Basilicata. Agostino "August" Coppola (1882-1946) emigrated to the United States circa 1905. He married Maria Zasa (1887-1974) (also from Bernalda) on January 25, 1908. They had seven children - Archimedes, Carmine, Pancrazzo, Mario, Anton, Edward and Clarence. The best-known members (Francis Ford Coppola, Nicolas Cage) are descended from Carmine Coppola.

Family tree

Academy Awards 
The lineal descendants of Carmine Coppola and Italia Pennino have been nominated 23 times for an Academy Award, winning 9 times in categories including Best Picture, Best Director, Best Actor, Best Original Screenplay, Best Adapted Screenplay, and Best Original Score. In addition, Talia Shire's ex-husband David Shire, Sofia Coppola's ex-husband Spike Jonze, and Nicolas Cage's ex-wife Patricia Arquette are also Academy Award winners. Talia Shire's late husband Jack Schwartzman is also the father of Oscar nominee John Schwartzman by a previous marriage.

References

Bibliography
Coppola, Francis Ford (2012-12-08). Back to Bernalda. T (International Herald Tribune Style Magazine), December 8, 2012. Retrieved from http://tmagazine.blogs.nytimes.com/2012/11/15/back-to-bernalda/.

External links
Coppola, Francis Ford (2012-12-08). Back to Bernalda. T (International Herald Tribune Style Magazine), December 8, 2012. Retrieved from http://tmagazine.blogs.nytimes.com/2012/11/15/back-to-bernalda/.

 
American people of Italian descent
Roman Catholic families
Show business families of the United States